Willem Greve (born 26 February 1983) is a Dutch show jumping competitor. He represented the Netherlands at the 2020 Summer Olympics in Tokyo 2021, competing in individual jumping.

References

 

1983 births
Living people
Dutch male equestrians
Equestrians at the 2020 Summer Olympics
Olympic equestrians of the Netherlands
Dutch show jumping riders
People from Haaksbergen
Sportspeople from Overijssel
21st-century Dutch people